Jon Alston (born June 4, 1983) is an American screenwriter, director, producer and former NFL linebacker. He has written and produced on critically acclaimed shows such as S.W.A.T. and All American. His first feature-length film, Red Butterfly, debuted at the 23rd Annual St. Louis International Film Festival. His sophomore film, Augustus, has received 24 wins and five nominations since its debut in 2020, notably winning the Directorial Discovery Grand Prize at the Rhode Island International Film Festival. 

Prior to filmmaking, Alston earned a football scholarship to Stanford University which led to a career in the National Football League. He was drafted by the St. Louis Rams in the third round of the 2006 NFL Draft, ultimately spending five seasons in the NFL as a linebacker. Alston additionally played for the Oakland Raiders and Tampa Bay Buccaneers; he retired in 2011.

Jon later graduated from Stanford University with a degree in Film and Media Studies before matriculating at USC's School of Cinematic Arts.

Early years
Alston grew up in Bastrop, Louisiana, but moved to Shreveport, Louisiana shortly before high school.  He got his first taste of organized football in his freshman year of high school at Loyola College Prep.  Jon excelled in football, earning All-District honors in his sophomore, junior year, and All-State his senior year. As a linebacker, Alston registered 134 tackles and 21 stops for losses in his senior season. He played free safety, middle linebacker and tight end as a sophomore and started at running back as a freshman

Football career

College career
Alston went on to play college football for the Stanford Cardinal. In 43 games with the Cardinal, Alston started 27 times. He finished his career with 164 tackles (94 solos), 21 sacks and 29.5 stops for losses.

Professional career

Pre-draft
One of the most athletic linebackers in all of football, posting a 4.40 40-yd dash and 40" vertical leap at the 2006 NFL Combine. He also had a 11'00" broad jump. and bench-pressed 225 pounds 30 times. At the Stanford pro day, Alston ran a 4.40 40-yard dash.

St. Louis Rams
Alston was drafted in the third round (77th overall) of the 2006 NFL Draft by the St. Louis Rams. In 2006, he made 2 special teams tackles for the Rams. On September 1, 2007, he was released by the Rams.

Oakland Raiders
On September 3, 2007, Alston was signed to the Oakland Raiders' practice squad. He was then promoted to the active roster after Travis Taylor was released.  He played in 13 games in the 2007 season for the Raiders, recording 8 tackles and 1 forced fumble.

On March 27, 2008, Alston was re-signed as an exclusive rights free agent by the Raiders for the 2008 season. After linebacker Robert Thomas was waived/injured on September 2, Alston switched from No. 94 to Thomas' No. 55. Thomas was then re-signed by the Raiders weeks later. On October 19, 2008,  in a game against the New York Jets, the Raiders were forced to punt on a 3 and out. However, longsnapper Jon Condo directly snapped the ball to Alston, who ran it for 22 yards on a fake punt play. In 2008, Alston led the Raiders in special teams tackles with 20 despite missing two games and starting 4 games at OLB. He ended the season with 34 total tackles and 1 pass defensed. Against the Chargers, Alston garnered a career-high of 11 total tackles including 9 on defense and 2 on special teams.

Alston suffered a concussion and was placed on Injured Reserve on November 25, 2009.

Tampa Bay Buccaneers
On March 12, 2010, Alston signed with the Tampa Bay Buccaneers. Alston retired from the sport in 2011.

Film career
Alston's first film, Red Butterfly was independently produced. Alston cites the works of Carl Jung and Joseph Campbell as influences on the film. Red Butterfly is a postmodern romantic tragedy in the style of Baz Luhrmann's Romeo and Juliet and Darren Aronofsky's Requiem for a Dream. 

Alston's sophomore film, Augustus, won the Directorial Discovery Grand Prize at the Rhode Island International Film Festival in addition to being awarded the distinction of Best Director at multiple festivals in 2020.

Awards and nominations

Film

Screenwriting 
Alston's first feature-length screenplay, based on an eponymous Oscar nominated short-doc, was one of three selections to win the Atlanta Film Festival Screenplay Competition in 2022. Prior to this, he and his co-writer won the Missouri Stories Scriptwriting fellowship in 2020.

His first hour-long pilot was a finalist in 11 screenwriting competitions between 2021-2022. Festivals include ScreenCraft TV Pilot Script Competition, PAGE International Screenwriting Awards Competition, Launch Pad Pilot Competition and HollyShorts Screenwriting Competition among others. The project is also listed in the top 1% of Discoverable Projects on Coverfly.

External links
 
Oakland Raiders bio
Stanford Cardinal bio
The Wrap
Variety

References

1983 births
Living people
Players of American football from Shreveport, Louisiana
American football defensive ends
American football linebackers
Stanford Cardinal football players
St. Louis Rams players
Oakland Raiders players
Tampa Bay Buccaneers players